The 12th Regiment may refer to many military units.

 12th Infantry Regiment (South Korea)
 12th Regiment Royal Artillery
 12th Infantry Regiment (Philippine Commonwealth)
 12th Infantry Regiment (USAFIP-NL)
 12th Infantry Regiment (United States)
 12th Cavalry Regiment (United States)
 12th Regiment Massachusetts Volunteer Infantry (American Civil War)
 12th Armoured Regiment (Australia)
 12th Armoured Regiment (India)